Hippotion talboti is a moth species of the family Sphingidae. It occurs on São Tomé Island.

References

 Pinhey, E (1962): Hawk Moths of Central and Southern Africa. Longmans Southern Africa, Cape Town.

Hippotion
Moths described in 1930
Moths of São Tomé and Príncipe
Moths of Africa